South Korean boy group 2PM has embarked on numerous concert tours, including 4 Asia tours, 2 Korea tours, 6 Japan tours, and 1 worldwide tour.

Asia/Korea tours

1st Concert: Don't Stop Can't Stop

2nd Concert: Hands Up Asia Tour

"What Time Is It?" Asia Tour

2PM Concert "House Party"

Japan tours

First Japan Tour: Take Off

Japan Arena Tour 2011: Republic of 2PM

Six Beautiful Days Tour

Japan Arena Tour 2013: Legend of 2PM

Japan Arena Tour 2014: Genesis of 2PM

Japan Arena Tour 2015: 2PM of 2PM

2PM Six "Higher" Days

World tours

Go Crazy World Tour

Concert participation

JYP Nation
2009 JYP Tour
2010 Wonder Girls World Tour (in USA as Opening Act)
2010 JYP Nation Team Play Concert
2011 JYP Nation Concert in Japan
2012 JYP Nation Concert in Seoul
2012 JYP Nation Concert in Japan
2014 JYP Nation ONE MIC in Seoul
2014 JYP Nation ONE MIC in Hong Kong
2014 JYP Nation ONE MIC in Tokyo
2014 JYP Nation ONE MIC in Bangkok
2016 JYP Nation Hologram Concert
2016 JYP Nation Mix&Match Concert

References 

2PM
2PM
2PM